Simson may refer to:

 Simson (name) 
 Simson (artist) Music Producer based out of Milwaukee, Wisconsin.
 Simson (company), a German company that produced firearms, automobiles, motorcycles, and mopeds 
 Simson line in geometry, named for Robert Simson
 Simson Provincial Park in Canada
 KSV Simson Bremen, German football club

See also 
 Samson (disambiguation)
 Simpson (disambiguation)